Robert P. Griffin (1923–2015) was a U.S. Senator from Michigan from 1966 to 1979. Senator Griffin may also refer to:

Anthony J. Griffin (1866–1935), New York State Senate
Ben Hill Griffin Jr. (1910–1990), Florida State Senate
Gail Griffin (fl. 1990s–2010s), Arizona State Senate
James D. Griffin (1929–2008), New York State Senate
James W. Griffin (born 1935), Iowa State Senate
John K. Griffin (1789–1841), South Carolina State Senate
John Griffin (Allegany County, New York) (1770s–1846), New York State Senate
Michael Griffin (Wisconsin politician) (1842–1899), Wisconsin State Senate